Portia Ann Doubleday is an American actress. She is best known for her roles as Sheeni Saunders in the film Youth in Revolt (2009), Chris Hargensen in the film Carrie (2013), and as Angela Moss in the USA Network television drama Mr. Robot (2015–2019).

Early life
Born and raised in Los Angeles, Doubleday is the younger of two daughters of Christina Hart and Frank Doubleday. She grew up in a show business family: her parents are former professional actors, and her older sister, Kaitlin is also an actress. Her mother now works in the entertainment industry as a writer and producer of plays.

Doubleday attended the Los Angeles Center for Enriched Studies, a magnet school in west Los Angeles. She played soccer for twelve years and described herself as a tomboy to the Los Angeles Times.

Career
Doubleday first appeared in a commercial for Goldfish crackers at age eight and had a small role in the film Legend of the Mummy (1998). Her parents insisted that she finish high school before pursuing a career in acting.

After graduating high school Doubleday was cast in the pilot episode of United States of Tara, a television series created by Diablo Cody. Doubleday played 15-year-old Kate, the daughter of Toni Collette's character. Doubleday was replaced by Brie Larson when the series' creative team chose to go in a different direction with the character. She appeared in the short film 18 in 2009, about a girl dealing with the end of her mother's life.

Doubleday starred opposite Michael Cera in the 2009 teen comedy Youth in Revolt, based on the 1993 novel of the same name by C.D. Payne. Doubleday described her character as "mean" and "really complex" to the Los Angeles Times. She plays Sheeni Saunders, an imaginative girl with a dreary life who meets Michael Cera's character while on a family vacation. The film was directed by Miguel Arteta and premiered at the 2009 Toronto International Film Festival.

In 2010, Doubleday starred in the drama Almost Kings (formerly known as Touchback) directed by Marvin Jarrett (the founder of Nylon magazine). She appeared regularly in the ABC network comedy Mr. Sunshine, a midseason replacement for the 2010–2011 season. She played the popular and monstrous Chris Hargensen in the 2013 adaptation of Carrie, a role which was originally held by Nancy Allen. Doubleday dyed her hair brown for the role of Chris who is a natural brunette in the novel. In the same year she played a brief role in Her as a sex surrogate.

In September 2014, it was announced that Doubleday had joined the main cast of the USA Network pilot for the TV series Mr. Robot. Doubleday plays Malek's character's childhood friend and current co-worker, Angela Moss. The first episode of the series premiered on June 24, 2015. She acted in all four seasons of the show, the final three which premiered in July 2016, October 2017, and October 2019 respectively.

In November 2018, it was announced that Doubleday had joined the cast of the film Fantasy Island, an adaptation of the show of the same name. The movie was released on February 14, 2020.

Personal life 
Doubleday lives in Los Angeles.

Filmography

Film

Television

References

External links
 

20th-century American actresses
21st-century American actresses
Actresses from Los Angeles
American child actresses
American film actresses
American television actresses
Living people
Year of birth missing (living people)